The 2022 France Women's Sevens was the final rugby sevens event on the 2021–22 Women's Sevens Series. An annual Series event since 2016, it was the first event to be played since 2019 due to the impacts of COVID-19. The defending champions from the 2019 series event were the United States, whom beat New Zealand 26–10. 

New Zealand won in the Final against Australia 21–14.

Format
The twelve teams are drawn into three pools of four. Each team will play their other three opponents in their pool once. The top two teams from each pool advance to the Cup bracket, with the two best third-placed teams also advancing. The remaining four teams will compete for a 9th–12th placing.

Teams 
The twelve national women's teams competing in France were: 
 
  
 
 
 
 
 
   
 
 
 
 
 
  

 Scotland returned to the series as an invited team. Their previous appearance as an individual team was also in France, at the most previous event (2019 Biarritz). 
 South Africa was an invited team for the tournament and made their first appearance on the World Series since the their home event in 2019, Cape Town.

Pool stage
The team composition of the pool stage was announced on 4 May.

Pool A

Pool B

Pool C

Ranking of third-placed teams

Knockout stage

9th–12th playoffs

5th–8th playoffs

Cup playoffs

Placings

Source: World Rugby

See also
 2022 France Sevens (for men)

References

External links
 Tournament site  

2022
2021–22 World Rugby Women's Sevens Series
2022 in women's rugby union 
2022 rugby sevens competitions 
May 2022 sports events in France